Salsa is an EP by American alternative rock band Residual Kid, released on April 8, 2016.  It was produced by Chris "Frenchie" Smith. To celebrate the release, the band held an EP release show at The Hi-Dive in Denver, Colorado. The song "Scentless Princess" was released as the lead single from the EP, with a video directed by Joshua Logan and Michael Anthony Gibson. A second music video was released later on for the song "Chill".

Track listing

Personnel

Residual Kid
  Deven Ivy – vocals, guitar
  Ben Redman – drums
  Max Redman – bass guitar

Production
Produced by Chris "Frenchie" Smith
Recorded by Sean Rolie
Mixed by Chris "Frenchie" Smith and Sean Rolie
Mastered by Alex Lyon

References

External links
 Official website
 Facebook Page

2016 EPs
Residual Kid albums
Albums produced by Chris "Frenchie" Smith